Sounds from the Heart of Gothenburg is the second live album by Swedish heavy metal band In Flames. It was filmed on 8 November 2014 in front of a sold-out venue of 10,000 fans, right inside the Scandinavium in the band's hometown Gothenburg, Sweden. The concert was directed by Patric Ullaeus. It is the last release to feature long time drummer Daniel Svensson who left the band in 2015.

Background
Commenting on the release, guitarist Björn Gelotte said "This DVD is for everyone who was been following our career; we have songs from the early years, the middle years and the new era".

Reception
Adam Rees of Classic Rock magazine gave the album a positive review, calling it "another accomplished landmark for this enduring band", and rating it 3 and a half stars.

Track listing

Personnel
In Flames
Anders Fridén – vocals
Björn Gelotte – guitar
Niclas Engelin – guitar
Peter Iwers – bass
Daniel Svensson – drums

References

In Flames albums
2014 albums